Werner Haas (30 May 1927 – 13 November 1956) was a Grand Prix motorcycle road racer from Germany. He became Germany's first motorcycle world champion when he won the 1953 FIM 125 and 250 World Championship for NSU. The following year, he would repeat as the 250 world champion. Haas was killed in 1956 in a light plane accident in Germany.

Motorcycle Grand Prix results 

(Races in italics indicate fastest lap)

References 

1927 births
1956 deaths
Sportspeople from Augsburg
German motorcycle racers
125cc World Championship riders
250cc World Championship riders
Isle of Man TT riders
Recipients of the Silver Laurel Leaf
Victims of aviation accidents or incidents in Germany
Victims of aviation accidents or incidents in 1956
250cc World Riders' Champions
125cc World Riders' Champions